George Henry Jones (27 November 1918 – 1995) was an English footballer who played for Sheffield United between 1935–1950 in the position of winger.

References
Clarebrough, Denis (1989). Sheffield United F.C., The First 100 years. Sheffield United Football Club. .
They Played At The Lane, Sheffield United Match Day Programme, 20 September 1988.

Notes

1918 births
1995 deaths
Sheffield United F.C. players
Barnsley F.C. players
Footballers from Sheffield
English footballers
Association football wingers
Date of death missing
English Football League players